Sømna Church is a parish church of the Church of Norway in Sømna Municipality in Nordland county, Norway. It is located in the village of Vik i Helgeland. It is the church for the Sømna parish which is part of the Sør-Helgeland prosti (deanery) in the Diocese of Sør-Hålogaland. The white, wooden church was built in a cruciform style in 1876 using plans drawn up by the architect Ole Scheistrøen. The church seats about 600 people.

History
The earliest existing historical records of the church date back to the year 1432, but it was not new that year. The first church was likely a rectangular timber-framed building with a rectangular nave with a narrower rectangular chancel with a lower roof line. It had a small tower on the roof of the nave. In 1681, the old church was torn down and a new cruciform church was built on the same site to replace it.

In 1873, it was decided to build a new and larger church, but there wasn't room on the current church site. The new church building was completed in 1876. After the new church was completed, the old church was torn down and its materials were sold at auction in the village. The old cemetery (surrounding the old church) was used until 1980 when a new cemetery was opened.

See also
List of churches in Sør-Hålogaland

References

Sømna
Churches in Nordland
Wooden churches in Norway
Cruciform churches in Norway
19th-century Church of Norway church buildings
Churches completed in 1876
14th-century establishments in Norway